Bürvenich is a village in the borough of Zülpich in the district of Euskirchen, North Rhine-Westphalia.

References

Literature 
 Christian Quix: Die Grafen von Hengebach. Die Schlösser und Städtchen Heimbach und Niedeggen. Die ehemaligen Klöster Marienwald und Bürvenich und das Collegiatstift nachheriges Minoriten Kloster vor Niedeggen; geschichtlich dargestellt. Hensen (publ.); Aachen, 1839 (E-Kopiw).
 , Format: PDF

External links 

 Village website
 Views of the Eifel

Euskirchen (district)
Former municipalities in North Rhine-Westphalia